India's constitution is very vast. There is a separate article for each and every prospective. Article 47 of The Constitution of India is one of the Directive Principles which directs the State to raise the level of nutrition and the standard of living and to improve public health as among its primary duties and, in particular, the State shall endeavour to bring about prohibition of intoxicating drinks and drugs which are injurious to health.

See also
The Lakshadweep Prohibition Regulation, 1979
The Nagaland Liquor Total Prohibition Act, 1989
Bombay Prohibition (Gujarat Amendment) 2009
Bihar Excise (Amendment) Act, 2016

References

047
Health in India
Alcohol law in India